Henri Yves Brault (29 March 1928 – 29 May 2020) was a French sprinter who competed in the 1952 Summer Olympics.

References

1928 births
2020 deaths
French male sprinters
Olympic athletes of France
Athletes (track and field) at the 1952 Summer Olympics